"Saturday" is a song recorded by American musical duo Twenty One Pilots, released on May 18, 2021, through Fueled by Ramen, as the third single from their sixth studio album, Scaled and Icy (2021). It was written and produced by the duo's frontman, Tyler Joseph, with Greg Kurstin credited as co-producer. A music video for the song was released on July 8, 2021.

On August 31, 2021, the song became the ninth by the duo to peak at No. 1 on the US Alternative Airplay chart.

Background
The song's  bridge features an audio clip of a phone call with Tyler Joseph's wife Jenna, with her encouraging Joseph to move on with the creation of the track. Joseph stated that he was recording and decided it fit perfectly in the song. Jenna wanted to re-record the audio, as she didn't like the way it sounded, but Joseph convinced her to keep it.

The song was created while communicating virtually as the COVID-19 pandemic limited interaction between the members of the band.

Composition
"Saturday" is a pop and funk song that runs for a duration of two minutes and fifty-two seconds. It is considered a very upbeat song in contrast to the themes of their previous albums Trench and Blurryface. Joseph stated in an interview that he did not want to "hold a mirror up to our circumstances and create a record exactly as it appeared in front of us", continuing "I didn't think that a dismal record was appropriate; the idea of escaping that was more appealing to me. The reason why it feels almost disconnected from the reality in which the record was created is intentional. It's gonna feel a little lighter because of that."

Music video
Upon the release of "Saturday", Twenty One Pilots released a lyric video to promote the song. It shows depictions of 1980s synthwave-esque imagery, paired with the colors of Scaled and Icy – predominantly soft shades of pink, blue and yellow.

The official music video directed by Andrew Donoho was released on July 8, 2021, and filmed in San Diego, California. It features frontman Tyler Joseph and bandmate Josh Dun performing the song atop a submarine as people are entering, before the camera pans to the interior, in which a party is occurring and the duo are performing. Moments later, a gigantic sea dragon deliberately crashes into the submarine, causing it to break and begin to flood as the duo continue their performance submerged in water while the guests panic. Eventually, the band manages to escape from the sinking vehicle, and emerges on the surface. The video ends with the sea dragon swimming by, underneath the duo and remaining guests. As of April 2022, the music video has garnered more than 16 million views on YouTube.

On August 20, 2021, a behind the scenes video was released for the song.

Usage in media
"Saturday" appears on the soundtrack for the Electronic Arts video game NHL 22, released in October 2021.
It also appeared in the NCAA.

Personnel
Credits adapted from the liner notes of Scaled and Icy.

Twenty One Pilots 
 Tyler Joseph  lead vocals, guitar, bass, organs, keyboards, synthesizer, programming, production
 Josh Dun  drums, percussion, trumpet

Additional musicians 
 Paul Meany  production
 Greg Kurstin  production

Charts

Weekly charts

Year-end charts

Certifications

Release history

References

External links

2021 songs
2021 singles
Twenty One Pilots songs
Songs written by Tyler Joseph
Fueled by Ramen singles
Funk songs